is an opera composed by Riccardo Zandonai to an Italian libretto by . The opera is based on Gösta Berlings Saga by Nobel laureate Selma Lagerlöf. It was first performed at the Teatro alla Scala in Milan on 7 March 1925.

Roles

Sources
 
 www.italianopera.org

1925 operas
Operas by Riccardo Zandonai
Italian-language operas
Operas
Opera world premieres at La Scala
Operas based on novels
Operas set in Sweden
Selma Lagerlöf